Leopold Pichler (born 29 July 1942) is an Austrian weightlifter. He competed in the men's middleweight event at the 1972 Summer Olympics.

References

1942 births
Living people
Austrian male weightlifters
Olympic weightlifters of Austria
Weightlifters at the 1972 Summer Olympics
Place of birth missing (living people)
20th-century Austrian people